The 2008–09 season is the 99th season of competitive football by Ayr United.

Fixtures

Pre season

Scottish Second Division

Scottish Challenge Cup

Scottish League Cup

Scottish Cup

First Division play-offs

Semi-final

Final

Stats

League table

Results summary

Results by round

References

Ayr United F.C. seasons
Ayr United